

Incumbents
President: Hugo Chavez 
Vice President: 
 until October 13: Elias Jaua
 starting October 13: Nicolás Maduro

Governors
Amazonas: Liborio Guarulla 
Anzoátegui: Tarek William Saab then Aristóbulo Istúriz
Apure: Rafael Isea then Ramón Carrizales
Aragua: Tareck El Aissami 
Barinas: Hugo de los Reyes Chávez then Adán Chávez 
Bolívar: Francisco Rangel Gómez
Carabobo: Henrique Salas Feo then Francisco Ameliach  
Cojedes: Erika Farías 
Delta Amacuro: Lizeta Hernández
Falcón: Stella Lugo 
Guárico: Luis Gallardo then Ramón Rodríguez Chacín
Lara: Luis Reyes Reyes then Henri Falcón 
Mérida: Marcos Díaz Orellana then Alexis Ramirez 
Miranda: Henrique Capriles Radonski 
Monagas: José Gregorio Briceño then Yelitza Santaella
Nueva Esparta: Carlos Mata Figueroa 
Portuguesa: Wilmar Castro 
Sucre: Luis Acuña 
Táchira: César Pérez Vivas then José Vielma Mora 
Trujillo: Hugo Cabezas then Henry Rangel Silva
Vargas: Jorge García Carneiro
Yaracuy: Julio León Heredia
Zulia: Pablo Pérez Álvarez then Francisco Arias Cárdenas

Deaths 
 28 March: Feliciano Carvallo (b. 1920) — painter.
 2 April: Jesús Aguilarte (b. 1959) — político.
 13 April: Verónica Gómez Carabali (b. 1985) - volleyball player.
 2 May: Lourdes Valera (b. 1963) — actress.
 17 June: Herman "Chiquitín" Ettedgui (b. 1917) — sportsman, journalist and sports promoter.
 22 June: María Teresa Castillo (b. 1908) — activist, journalist, congresswoman and cultural promoter.
 10 August: Ramón Vásquez Brito (b. 1927) — painter.
 3 September: Virgilio Trómpiz (b. 1927) — painter.
 29 September:
 Antonio Valero — Justice First leader killed at a campaign rally in Barinitas.
 Omar Fernández — Democratic Action leader killed in the same event.
 21 October: Rodolfo Santana (b. 1944) — playwright and theater director.
 25 December: Augusto Bracca (b. 1918) — musician, composer and popular culturist.

See also 
 History of Venezuela

References 

 
2010s in Venezuela
Venezuela
Venezuela
Years of the 21st century in Venezuela